Rodrigo Teixeira Pereira (born 16 June 1978) is a Brazilian professional football striker who last played for River Plate Asunción in the Paraguay División Intermedia, the country's second-tier.

Career

Guaraní (2010)
In January 2010, Texeira signed with Guaraní for the entire season, joining players Jonathan Fabbro, Federico Santander, Elvis Marecos and Joel Silva. In February 2010, Texeira scored in a 3-1 victory against Club Sol de América.

Guaraní (2013)
In January 2013, ABC Color announced that Texeira was close to returning to Guaraní, when he attended a reunion with the club's president at the same time that Guaraní would also sign Julio César Caceres. It was then confirmed that Texeira officially signed with Guaraní, as a new member of the squad for the 2013 Primera División Paraguaya season and the Copa Sudamericana. In April, Texeira was hailed a hero for coming on as a substitute and scoring a double in a victory for Guaraní.

Sportivo Luqueño (2014–2015)
In January 2014, Texeira was presented as a Sportivo Luqueño player, signing for the 2014 season. Texeira joined the club amidst rumours of possible interest from Olimpia Asunción, however, Texeira joined Luqueño as replacement for the Uruguayan Hernan Rodrigo Lopez who departed Luqueño to join Libertad.

Deportivo Santaní (2015)
In January 2015, Teixeira joined newly promoted side Deportivo Santani, his fourth Paraguayan club. He was one of six signings presented by the club for the 2015 season. In February 2015, Teixeira scored in a 2–0 victory against Sportivo San Lorenzo in the first week of the season.

Personal life
In May 2010, Texeira suffered a transit accident in Asunción following a training session with Guaraní. He received various knocks, as well as his passengers, his Guaraní teammates. In July 2013,  Texeira married Jacqueline Madelaire Gubetich at the Asunción Catedral Metropolitana.

References

External links

 Teixeira's player card on FEF 
 Teixeira play in Deportivo Cuenca 

1978 births
Living people
Brazilian footballers
CR Vasco da Gama players
Barcelona S.C. footballers
Atlético Junior footballers
SV Wehen Wiesbaden players
F.C. Aboomoslem players
Caracas FC players
C.D. Cuenca footballers
Club Guaraní players
Club Nacional footballers
Sportivo Luqueño players
Paraguayan Primera División players
Ecuadorian Serie A players
Categoría Primera A players
Brazilian expatriate footballers
Expatriate footballers in Germany
Expatriate footballers in Iran
Expatriate footballers in Colombia
Expatriate footballers in Ecuador
Expatriate footballers in Paraguay
Expatriate footballers in Venezuela
CSM Ceahlăul Piatra Neamț players
Association football forwards
People from Barra Mansa